KCI may refer to:

Key Club International
Kitchener-Waterloo Collegiate and Vocational School
Kansas City International Airport
Korea Citation Index
Cedric "K-Ci" Hailey
Kinetic Concepts Inc
Kennel Club of India
Kereta Commuter Indonesia, Indonesian commuter railway operator

See also
Potassium Chloride (KCl, with a lowercase "l")